Giovanni Battista Finetti (15 January 1940 – 2 March 1983) was an Italian politician.

Biography
Finetti was a member of the Italian Communist Party and was elected Mayor of Grosseto on 20 July 1970. He was re-elected for two more terms in 1975 and 1980. He resigned in February 1982.

He was involved in a car accident in Istia d'Ombrone on 23 January 1983 and died on 2 March of the same year. His death has been often considered "suspicious" by the conspiracy theories about the so-called "Ustica affair".

References

Bibliography

See also
List of mayors of Grosseto

1940 births
1983 deaths
Mayors of Grosseto
Italian Communist Party politicians
People from Gavorrano